Goran Ivanišević was the defending champion and won in the final 7–6(7–4), 4–6, 7–6(8–6) against Greg Rusedski.

Seeds

  Goran Ivanišević (champion)
  Thomas Enqvist (semifinals)
  Jan Siemerink (second round)
  Marc Rosset (second round)
  Javier Sánchez (semifinals)
  Renzo Furlan (second round)
  David Prinosil (second round)
  Hendrik Dreekmann (first round)

Draw

Finals

Top half

Bottom half

References
 1997 Croatian Indoors Draw

Zagreb Indoors
1997 ATP Tour
1997 in Croatian tennis